The Veterans' Bill of Rights is a bill of rights in Canada for veterans of the Canadian Forces and Royal Canadian Mounted Police.  It was enacted by the Government of Canada in 2007.  It guarantees benefits for veterans from Veterans Affairs Canada and equality of veterans, and refers to them as "special citizens."  It also theoretically "entrenches respect and dignity for veterans and their families."

History
 
In the 2006 federal election, the Conservative Party of Canada campaigned for veterans' rights.  The Conservatives said a bill of rights would remedy what they saw as the "shameful way" veterans were handled by the government.  In December 2005, Conservative leader Stephen Harper claimed, "We continue to receive complaints that the department is not service-oriented... that is, the bureaucracy treats people as a bureaucracy and a number and that's obviously why we're making the bill of rights, the ombudsman and the structural changes we're talking about to try to shift that focus." The Conservatives formed a minority government.

Parliamentary secretary Betty Hinton assisted the introduction of the bill of rights, as did veterans' groups.  In April 2007, Prime Minister Harper and Minister of Veterans Affairs Greg Thompson told the press in Kitchener, Ontario that the bill of rights would come into effect then and there would be a new ombudsman for veterans along with it.  This discussion took place at around the same time as Harper was about to observe an anniversary of the Battle of Vimy Ridge in World War I.  Earlier, the Conservatives' budget included $19 million to introduce the ombudsman's office.

Text
The Bill of Rights contains seven rights and is meant to be "clear and concise." It reads:

See also
Canadian Charter of Rights and Freedoms
Canadian Bill of Rights
Canadian Human Rights Act

References

2007 in Canada
Canadian federal legislation
Veterans' affairs in Canada
National human rights instruments
Royal Canadian Mounted Police